Philip Henning (born 10 November 2000) is a South African tennis player.

Henning has a career high ATP singles ranking of 1608 achieved on 20 November 2017.

Henning represents South Africa at the Davis Cup, where he has a W/L record of 2–2.

Tennis Career Highlights

Juniors

In May 2017, Henning won his first ITF junior singles title at the G4 in Windhoek, Namibia. Henning has won 6 ITF junior titles in 2017 and 3 in 2018. In October 2018, Henning represented South Africa at the Youth Olympic Games.

As a junior, Henning reached a Career High Combined ranking of 35 in the International Tennis Federation’s world junior ranking.

As a junior, he compiled a singles win–loss record of 93–36.

Junior Grand Slam results - Singles:

Australian Open: 1R (2017), 3R (2018)
French Open: 1R (2018)
Wimbledon: 1R (2018)
US Open: 2R (2018)

Junior Grand Slam results - Doubles:

Australian Open: 1R (2017), QF (2018)
French Open: 1R (2018)
Wimbledon: 1R (2018)
US Open: 1R (2018)

Junior singles titles (9)

ATP Challenger and ITF Futures finals

Doubles: 2 (1-1)

References

External links

2000 births
Living people
Georgia Bulldogs tennis players
South African male tennis players
Sportspeople from Bloemfontein
Tennis players at the 2018 Summer Youth Olympics